Marwa Khamis (born 2 January 1985) is a Lebanese former footballer who played as a defender for the Lebanon national team.

International career
Khamis made her senior debut for Lebanon on 19 October 2010, in a 5–1 defeat to Egypt. She capped during the 2010 Arabia Women's Cup, the 2011 WAFF Women's Championship, the 2014 AFC Women's Asian Cup qualification and the 2015 Aphrodite Women Cup.

See also
 List of Lebanon women's international footballers

References

1985 births
Living people
People from Nabatieh District
Lebanese women's footballers
Women's association football defenders
Lebanon women's international footballers